Juliana Marie Addison (born 1 August 1974) is an Australian politician serving as the elected member for the Electoral district of Wendouree in the Victorian Legislative Assembly. She is a member of the Australian Labor Party.

Early career 
For 11 years prior to the 2018 election, Addison was teacher at Ballarat Clarendon College, where she taught history. She was also a Board Director at Ballarat Health Services

Political career 
Juliana was elected as Member for Wendouree at the 2018 Victorian State Election after the retirement of her predecessor Sharon Knight.

, she is chair of the parliamentary Economy and Infrastructure Committee.

Juliana was re-elected at the 2022 Election for her second term, defeating Liberal candidate and former Mayor of Ballarat Samantha McIntosh.

Personal Life 
Juliana lives in Ballarat with her Husband and two young daughters.

References

1974 births
Living people
Australian Labor Party members of the Parliament of Victoria
Members of the Victorian Legislative Assembly
Women members of the Victorian Legislative Assembly
21st-century Australian politicians
Labor Left politicians
Monash University alumni
University of Melbourne alumni
University of Melbourne women
People from Ballarat
Victoria (Australia) politicians
21st-century Australian women politicians